The Wigan station group is a small station group of two railway stations in Wigan, England consisting of North Western and Wallgate. The station group is printed on national rail tickets as WIGAN STATIONS.

Stations

Wigan North Western is Wigan's largest and busiest station, located on Wallgate and is managed by Avanti West Coast. The station is on the West Coast Main and Liverpool to Wigan lines (Liverpool services form a part of the Merseyrail City Line). North Western serves destinations across the UK, including; Preston, Scotland, Liverpool, Manchester, Crewe, Birmingham and London. Services are provided by Avanti West Coast, Northern and TransPennine Express.

Wigan Wallgate is located on Wallgate, a short distance from North Western station; all service and the station are provided by Northern. The station is on the Southport and Manchester Line and the branch to Kirkby. Unlike North Western, Wallgate is served only by local trains towards Manchester, Southport and Kirkby.

Connections
Tickets marked as WIGAN STATIONS may be used to exit the railway network at any of the two stations. Both stations are located almost opposite each other on the same road, Wallgate, and are easy to transfer between on foot.

See also
Wigan bus station
Wigan Central railway station

External links
Station information for North Western station from National Rail
Station information for Walgate station from National Rail